In mathematics Kazamaki's condition gives a sufficient criterion ensuring that the Doléans-Dade exponential of a local martingale is a true martingale. This is particularly important if Girsanov's theorem is to be applied to perform a change of measure. Kazamaki's condition is more general than Novikov's condition.

Statement of Kazamaki's condition 
Let  be a continuous local martingale with respect to a right-continuous filtration . If  is a uniformly integrable submartingale, then the Doléans-Dade exponential Ɛ(M) of M is a uniformly integrable martingale.

References 

Martingale theory